Li Hong (born 16 January 1993) is a Chinese footballer currently playing as a left-back or centre-back for Shaanxi Chang'an Athletic.

Club career
Li Hong would play for the Changchun Yatai youth team before being promoted to their senior team and then loaned to third tier club Shaanxi Laochenggen in the 2013 China League Two season. On his return to Changchun he would be moved to their reserve squad until he transferred to second tier football club Zhejiang Yiteng on 26 February 2018. He would gradually establish himself as a regular within the team and aided his club to a twelfth place finish, however despite this the club were relegated after the club failed to apply for a League One license.

Li Hong joined another third tier club Yunnan Kunlu in the 2020 China League Two season before joining second tier club Shaanxi Chang'an Athletic on 15 April 2021. He would make his debut in a league game on 5 May 2021 in a 4-1 victory against Xinjiang Tianshan Leopard F.C.

Career statistics
.

References

External links

1993 births
Living people
Footballers from Changchun
Footballers from Jilin
Chinese footballers
Association football midfielders
China League Two players
China League One players
Changchun Yatai F.C. players
Shaanxi Chang'an Athletic F.C. players